The Héctor Espino Baseball Stadium (Estadio de Béisbol Héctor Espino) is a baseball stadium located in Hermosillo, Sonora, Mexico.  The field is located in the north side of the city. It is home to the Naranjeros de Hermosillo (Hermosillo Orange Pickers) of the Mexican Pacific League.

In October 1972, the stadium was opened to the public and originally known as was known as "Coloso del Choyal" or the Choyal Colossus.  When first built, the stadium had a capacity of 10,000.  As of 2012 the stadium holds 15,000 spectators.

In 1976, the stadium was officially renamed for Héctor Espino, a famous Mexican baseball player.  Espino's career spanned 24 seasons, from 1960 to 1984.

The stadium has hosted six Caribbean Series in 1974, 1982, 1987, 1992, and 1997.  In addition, it has hosted several Arizona Diamondbacks pre-season games.  The venue is also utilized for concerts

The stadium is also the first in Latin America to feature a big screen and a digital LED display scoreboard.  Seats are divided in various sections and different prices to accommodate various economic needs.  Amenities of the stadium include an extensive food court, souvenir shops, and a state-of-the-art lighting system.

References

Baseball venues in Mexico
Hermosillo
Sports venues in Sonora
Sports venues completed in 1972
1972 establishments in Mexico